Carex endlichii is a tussock-forming perennial in the family Cyperaceae. It is native to parts of Central America and southern parts of North America.

See also
 List of Carex species

References

endlichii
Plants described in 1910
Taxa named by Georg Kükenthal
Flora of Mexico
Flora of Arizona
Flora of Guatemala